Haniffia is a genus of plants in the ginger family, Zingiberaceae. It has 3 known species, native to Thailand and to Peninsular Malaysia.

 Haniffia albiflora K.Larsen & J.Mood - Thailand 
 Haniffia cyanescens (Ridl.) Holttum - Peninsular Malaysia
 Haniffia flavescens Y.Y.Sam & Julius  - Peninsular Malaysia

References

Zingiberoideae
Zingiberaceae genera